Lugalsilâsi I was an ancient Iraqi ruler. He ruled sometime during the Early Dynastic IIIb period; additionally, temp. Eannatum, Akurgal, Ush, E-iginimpa'e, and Ikun-Mari. Lugalsilâsi I was preceded by Lugalnamniršumma as the king of Uruk. Lugalsilâsi I may have also been succeeded by Meskalamdug as a great king of Kish.

References

Notes

Citations

Sources

Bibliography

External links

Sumerian kings

25th-century BC Sumerian kings
Kings of Kish